Dentimargo is a genus of sea snails, marine gastropod mollusks in the family Marginellidae, the margin snails.

Species
Species within the genus Dentimargo include:

 Dentimargo aggressorum Cossignani & Lorenz, 2018
 Dentimargo alchymista Melvill & Standen, 1903
 Dentimargo aliguayensis Bozzetti, 2017
 Dentimargo alisae Boyer, 2001
 Dentimargo allporti Tenison-Woods, 1876
 Dentimargo altus Watson, 1886
 Dentimargo amoenus (Suter, 1908)
 Dentimargo anticleus (Dall, 1919)
 Dentimargo argonauta Espinosa & Ortea, 2002
 Dentimargo arvinus Laseron, 1957
 Dentimargo auratus Espinosa, Ortea & Moro, 2014 
 Dentimargo aureocinctus (Stearns, 1872)
 Dentimargo balicasagensis Cossignani, 2001
 Dentimargo basareoi Espinosa, Ortea & Moro, 2012 
 Dentimargo bavayi Espinosa, Ortea & Moro, 2011
 Dentimargo bifurcatus Boyer, 2017
 Dentimargo binotatus (Sykes, 1905)
 Dentimargo biocal Boyer, 2002
 Dentimargo bojadorensis Thiele, 1925
 Dentimargo cairoma (Brookes, 1924)
 Dentimargo caribbaeus Espinosa & Ortea, 2015
 Dentimargo chaperi Jousseaume, 1875
 Dentimargo cingulatus Boyer, 2002
 Dentimargo clarus Thiele, 1925
 Dentimargo claroi Espinosa, Fernandez-Garcès & Ortea, 2004
 Dentimargo cruzmoralai Espinosa & Ortea, 2000
 Dentimargo debruini Cossignani, 1998
 Dentimargo delphinicus Bavay, 1920
 Dentimargo dentatus Lussi & G. Smith, 1996
 Dentimargo dentiens (May, 1911)
 Dentimargo dianae Lussi & G. Smith, 1996
 Dentimargo didieri Espinosa & Ortea, 2013
 Dentimargo dimidius Garrard, 1966
 Dentimargo dispoliatus Bavay, 1922
 Dentimargo eburneolus (Conrad, 1834)
 Dentimargo elatus Watson, 1886
 Dentimargo elpilar Espinosa & Ortea, 2018
 † Dentimargo elusiva Sosso, Brunetti & Dell'Angelo, 2015 
 Dentimargo epacrodonta Roth, 1978
 Dentimargo eremus Dall, 1919
 Dentimargo esther (Dall, 1927)
 Dentimargo exquisitus Boyer, 2017
 Dentimargo fortis Laseron, 1957
 Dentimargo fusiformis (Hinds, 1844)
 Dentimargo fusinus (Dall, 1881)
 Dentimargo fusulus (Murdoch & Suter, 1906)
 Dentimargo fusuloides (Dell, 1956)
 Dentimargo galindoensis Espinosa, Moro & Ortea, 2011
 Dentimargo gibbus Garcia, 2006
 Dentimargo giovannii Pérez-Dionis, Espinosa & Ortea, 2014
 Dentimargo grandidietti Cossignani, 2001
 Dentimargo guionneti Cossignani, 2001
 Dentimargo habanensis Espinosa, Ortea & Moro, 2012 
 Dentimargo hebescens (Murdoch & Suter, 1906)
 Dentimargo hennequini Cossignani, 2004
 Dentimargo hesperia (Sykes, 1905)
 Dentimargo idiochilus Schwengel, 1943
 Dentimargo imitator (Dall, 1927)
 Dentimargo incessa (Dall, 1927)
 Dentimargo jaffa Cotton, 1944
 Dentimargo janae T. Cossignani, 2011 
 Dentimargo jeanmartinii Cossignani, 2008
 Dentimargo kawamurai (Habe, 1951)
 Dentimargo kemblensis (Hedley, 1903)
 Dentimargo kevini Cossignani, 2004
 Dentimargo kicoi Espinosa & Ortea, 2015
 Dentimargo lantzi (Jousseaume, 1875)
 Dentimargo lodderae (May, 1911)
 Dentimargo luridus (Suter, 1908)
 Dentimargo macnairi (Bavay, 1922)
 Dentimargo makiyamai (Habe, 1951)
 Dentimargo mayabequensis Espinosa & Ortea, 2015
 Dentimargo mayii (Tate, 1900)
 Dentimargo montrouzieri Boyer, 2003
 Dentimargo nauticus Espinosa, Ortea & Moro, 2012 
 Dentimargo neglectus G.B. Sowerby II, 1846
 Dentimargo osmayi Espinosa & Ortea, 2014
 Dentimargo perexilis (Bavay, 1922)
 Dentimargo pumilus Redfield, 1869
 Dentimargo quilonicus (Melvill, 1898)
 Dentimargo ratzingeri Cossignani, 2006
 Dentimargo redferni Espinosa, Ortea & Moro, 2012 
 Dentimargo reductus (Bavay, 1922)
 Dentimargo repentinus Sikes, 1905
 † Dentimargo rhytidobasis (Lozouet, 1999) 
 Dentimargo rincigula G.B. Sowerby III, 1901
 Dentimargo rivesi Espinosa & Ortea, 2013
 Dentimargo rogeri Espinosa & Ortea, 2014
 Dentimargo scapulatus Boyer, 2017
 Dentimargo slateri Lussi & G. Smith, 2015
 Dentimargo smithii (A. E. Verrill, 1885)
 Dentimargo somalicus Cossignani, 2001
 Dentimargo spengleri Lussi, 2007
 Dentimargo spongiarum Boyer, 2001
 Dentimargo stewartiana (Suter, 1908)
 Dentimargo suavis (Souverbie, 1859)
 Dentimargo subamoenus (Powell, 1937)
 Dentimargo subfusulus (Powell, 1932)
 Dentimargo subventricosior (Souverbie, 1863)
 Dentimargo tanorus (Dall, 1927)
 Dentimargo teramachi Habe, 1951
 Dentimargo tillmanni Espinosa & Ortea, 2013
 Dentimargo tonyi Espinosa & Ortea, 2014
 Dentimargo totomiensis Makiyama, 1927
 Dentimargo tropicensis Boyer, 2002
 Dentimargo tropicus (Laseron, 1957)
 Dentimargo undulatus Boyer, 2017
 Dentimargo vincenzoi Cossignani, 2001
 Dentimargo virginiae Boyer, 2001
 Dentimargo vitoria Espinosa & Ortea, 2005
 Dentimargo walkeri E.A. Smith, 1899
 Dentimargo wormaldi (Powell, 1971)
 Dentimargo yucatecana (Dall, 1881)
 Dentimargo zaidettae Espinosa & Ortea, 2000
 Dentimargo zanzibaricus Bozzetti, 1997
 Dentimargo zetetes Roth, 1978

Species brought into synonymy
 Dentimargo boyeri Bozzetti, 1994: synonym of Eratoidea boyeri (Bozzetti, 1994)
 Dentimargo cecalupoi Cossignani, 2005: synonym of Demissa cecalupoi (Cossignani, 2005) (original combination)
 Dentimargo costulata Thiele, 1925: synonym of Eratoidea costulata (Thiele, 1925)
 Dentimargo janeiroensis E.A. Smith, 1915: synonym of Eratoidea janeiroensis (E. A. Smith, 1915)
 Dentimargo lateritius (Melvill & Sykes, 1903): synonym of Marginella lateritia Melvill & Sykes, 1903
 Dentimargo procrita (Kilburn, 1977): synonym of Demissa procrita (Kilburn, 1977)
 Dentimargo sinuosa Bozzetti, 1997: synonym of Eratoidea sinuosa (Bozzetti, 1997)
 Dentimargo stylaster Boyer, 2001: synonym of Serrata stylaster (Boyer, 2001)
 Dentimargo sulcata d' Orbigny, 1842: synonym of Eratoidea sulcata (d'Orbigny, 1842)

References

 Olsson A. A. & Harbison A. (1953). Pliocene Mollusca of southern Florida with special reference to those from North Saint Petersburg. Monographs of the Academy of Natural Sciences of Philadelphia 8: 1-457, pl. 1-65
 Laseron C.F. (1957) A new classification of the Australian Marginellidae (Mollusca), with a review of species from the Solanderian and Dampierian zoogeographical provinces. Australian Journal of Marine and Freshwater Research 8: 274-311. page(s): 286
 Cossignani T. (2006). Marginellidae & Cystiscidae of the World. L'Informatore Piceno. 408pp
 Olsson A. A. & Harbison A. (1953). Pliocene Mollusca of southern Florida with special reference to those from North Saint Petersburg. Monographs of the Academy of Natural Sciences of Philadelphia 8: 1-457, pl. 1-65

External links
 Cossmann, M. (1899). Essais de paléoconchologie comparée. Troisième livraison. Paris, The author and Comptoir Géologique. 201 pp., 8 pls

Marginellidae